A thickness planer (also known in the UK and Australia as a thicknesser or in North America as a planer) is a woodworking machine to trim boards to a consistent thickness throughout their length.  
This machine transcribes the desired thickness using the downside as a reference / index.  So, to produce a completely straight planed board requires that the down surface is straight before planing.  Obtaining the first flat side requires either face planing with a jointer or face planing using a planer and jointer sled.

Function 
A thickness planer is a woodworking machine to trim boards to a consistent thickness throughout their length and flat on both surfaces.

It is different from a surface planer, or jointer, where the cutter head is set into the bed surface. A surface planer has slight advantages for producing the first flat surface and may be able to do so in a single pass. However the thicknesser has more important advantages in that it can produce a board with a consistent thickness, avoids producing a tapered board, and by making passes on each side and turning the board, may also be used for the initial preparation of an unplaned board.

Design

A thickness planer consists of three elements: a cutter head which contains the cutting knives; a set of rollers which draw the board through the machine; and a table which is adjustable relative to the cutter head to control the resultant thickness of the board. Some portable thickness planers differ slightly in that the table is fixed and the cutter head/feed roller assembly is adjusted.

Industrial thickness planers are capable of accepting very wide boards and removing large amounts of material in a single pass. These machines are driven by powerful motors and are of very heavy construction. In recent times, a range of lightweight portable thickness planers have become available which use the cheaper, but noisy, universal motors rather than induction motors and are much less expensive than industrial versions.

In Europe, the functions of the jointer and thickness planer are often combined into a single combination machine, a jointer-planer.  In the U.K. this is called a planer–thicknesser or over–and–under.

Operation

In operation, the table is set to the desired height and then the machine is switched on. The board is fed into the machine until it makes contact with the in-feed roller which grips the board and draws it into the machine and past the rotating cutter head. The knives remove material on the way through and the out-feed roller pulls the board through and ejects it from the machine at the end of the pass.

To finish a board that is flat and of uniform thickness along its length, it is necessary to start with a board that has at least one perfectly flat reference face. The board is fed with this reference face flat on the table and the cutter head removes an amount of material from the opposite face so that it is made parallel to the reference face. The reference face is often created by first passing the board over a jointer. If the lower face is not flat, the feed roller pressure pressing the board against the table will deform the board, which will then spring back as it leaves the machine, resulting in a non-flat upper surface.

One problem often encountered when using a thickness planer is snipe. This manifests as a deeper cut on a short section of the board at either end and is caused by incorrect feeding or misalignment of the in-feed or out-feed tables, or an unnecessarily high setting of the rollers recessed in the surface of the in-feed table. It can be accommodated by keeping the board overlong to allow later trimming.

See also
Planing mill
A very general guide on Thickness Planer from DECD

References

Woodworking machines
Planes